Daviesia daphnoides is a species of flowering plant in the family Fabaceae and is endemic to the south-west of Western Australia. It is a bushy or spreading shrub with glabrous foliage, sharply-pointed narrow elliptic to egg-shaped phyllodes with the narrower end towards the base and yellow and dark red flowers.

Description

Taxonomy and naming
Daviesia daphnoides was first formally described in 1844 by Carl Meissner in Lehmann's Plantae Preissianae from specimens collected by James Drummond in 1840. The specific epithet (daphnoiides) means "Daphne-like".

Distribution and habitat
This species of pea grows in kwongan heathland from Walkaway to near Perth in the Avon Wheatbelt, Geraldton Sandplains and Jarrah Forest biogeographic regions of south-western Western Australia.

Conservation status
Daviesia daphnoides is classified as "not threatened" by the Government of Western Australia Department of Biodiversity, Conservation and Attractions.

References

daphnoides
Eudicots of Western Australia
Plants described in 1844
Taxa named by Carl Meissner